Cedar County Sheriff's House and Jail are historic buildings located in Tipton, Iowa, United States. The facility was known as a “Mom and Pop Jail.” The sheriff's wife, who was Mom, did the cooking and the sheriff, or a deputy, was Pop and provided supervision and administration.  It is thought to be the last jail and residence combination still in use when it closed in 2001.   The buildings were constructed in brick and were listed on the National Register of Historic Places in 2003 as a part of the Municipal, County and State Corrections Properties MPS.

References

Tipton, Iowa
National Register of Historic Places in Cedar County, Iowa
Houses in Cedar County, Iowa
Jails on the National Register of Historic Places in Iowa
Houses on the National Register of Historic Places in Iowa
Victorian architecture in Iowa
2001 disestablishments in Iowa